Stag Hill may refer to:
 Stag Hill, Guildford, a neighbourhood in Guildford, England
 Houvenkopf Mountain, New Jersey
 Stag Hill, University of Surrey, the main campus of the university